The body of water named Lake Placid is a lake in the Adirondack Mountains in northern New York, the United States.  It is on the northern side of the Village of Lake Placid.

Geography
It is located in the towns of North Elba and St. Armand, both in Essex County.

There are three islands on Lake Placid, named Buck, Moose, and Hawk.

Conservation
The lake borders the northern part of the village of Lake Placid, and is a source of drinking water for the town. Maintaining water quality in the lake is a major local issue. The lake is fed by springs and Adirondacks mountain streams. There are nearly 300 houses on the lake shore. Because most of the houses are unoccupied much of the year, the water usually remains clean.

Local efforts to combat aquatic invasive species have been successful. They are supported by a boat cleaning station where powerboats are put into the water.

The lake has produced record lake trout.

See also
Adirondack Park

References

Image gallery

Placid, Lake
Adirondacks
Adirondack Park
Placid
Tourist attractions in Essex County, New York